Tala station is an under-construction Manila Metro Rail Transit (MRT) station situated on Line 7. The station will be located  Tala, Caloocan.

Closest landmarks include the North Caloocan Doctors Hospital, St. Dominic Savio College, Bankers Village and Pangarap Village.

External links
Proposed Tala MRT Station

Manila Metro Rail Transit System stations
Proposed railway stations in the Philippines